Chubak Vasyl Volodymyrovich (Чубак Василь Володимирович, born May 2, 1964 Mushkativka, Borshchiv raion, Ternopil Oblast, Ukraine) is a Ukrainian businessman.

He is chairman of the regional branch of the Ukrainian Union of Industrialists and Entrepreneurs in the Ternopil oblast, head of the Ternopil Regional Association of Employers, and owner of one of the largest trade and entertainment centres in Western Ukraine, "Podolyany", in Ternopil.

Biography 
Vasyl Chubak was born in Mushkativka, Borshchiv district in the family of builder Volodymyr Omelyanovych and Galina Yosypivna. The family grew 4 children.
Education of Vasyl was patriotic, because father Volodymyr Chubak was many years head of the organization of social movement of Borshchiv, he helped in reconstruction of Mushkativka's church, build a monument to Taras Shevchenko and the memorial sign of UPA. Grandfather Chubak Omelyan was head of sport "LUG (society) and "Prosvita" society.

Education 
After graduating from Mushativka's high school in 1979, he start studying in Ternopil SPTS No. 4; in 1982 he entered Ternopil State Pedagogical University named after V.Hnatiuk (now National), department of physical and sports education, while studying from 1983 to 1985 he served in the armed forces. Since 2006 studying in Ternopil national economic University, specialty: management of organizations, economist.

Professional activity  
He began his career at 16 years assisted his father in the establishment of the enterprise, which is specializing in building and construction works. In 1987 – 1988 – teacher in Ternopil SPTS No. 4. From 1988 to 1993 he worked in a number of cooperatives in Ternopil, as a marketing specialist was directly involved in the development and promotion of the Western region of Ukraine several types of industrial goods of own production. From 1993 to 1999 he was co-owner and director of Limited Liability Company "Elina", which worked in the textile industry. In 1996 he founded the Limited Liability Company "Terkuriy-2"which united the manufacture of stocking – hosiery products and other textile industries. For technological and technical processes stocking – hosiery factory "Terkuriy-2"  today is one of the leaders in its industry. Manufactured products, textile company sells in Ukraine and in EU. Since 2008 the company "Terkuriy-2"   made infrastructure and development project of a shopping and entertainment center "Podolyany". This modern centre with retail space of about 50 000 sq. m of branded stores,like Silpo(shopping network), Foxtrot, Comfy, Brocard, Reserved, Luxoptica, Intertop, Oodji, Top Secret, Milavitsa, A.Tan, Kira Plastinina, CCC, Centro, Kari, Colin's, and many others, with a 4-screen cinema Cinema Citi, the ice center "Eskimos", bowling Silver with 14 tracks, concert hall "Podolyany", food courts (site www.podolyany.com.ua ).
In SEC "Podolyany" employs about 3,000 people. Attendance of centre is about 20 000 people a day.

Social activity  
From 2007 to 2010 Vasyl Chubak was a member of the Ternopil city council, head of the city council of land resources, the chairman of the strategic planning committee for economic development of Ternopil. Since 2007 – head of the regional branch of the Ukrainian union of industrialists and entrepreneurs in Ternopil region; Since 2008 – chairman of the Ternopil regional organization of employers; Since 2011 – chairman of the Ternopil regional association of employers, which has about 3,000 enterprises and 29000 employees. On the basis of complex works of charity fund "Podolyany". Since 2008 Vasyl Chubak is co-founder, member of the board of the charity Found "Podolyany". Honorary president of the charity fund "Podolyany" is a famous athlete and public figure Lilia Podkopayeva. Its activities the foundation supports talented children and youth, helps regional and local hospitals, schools, boarding schools, children with special needs and military.

Special attention deserves the support of the hockey sport. On the basis of the ice center "Eskimos" train hockey players of child, youth and adult teams "Podolyany". A significant achievement of the team is in 4th place in the Western amateur league. Vasyl Chubak is vice president of the ice hockey federation of Ternopil region.

Additional information 
2010 candidate for the position of mayor, Ternopil elections to local councils and heads of city, village and township councils, the head of Ternopil regional organization of the party of industrialists and entrepreneurs in local elections. 2012 – the candidate for people's deputies in the electoral district No. 167.

Charity  
Reconstruction of exposition room of Pinzel in Ternopil regional museum;
Construction of monument to the bee in Ternopil;
Founder of art gallery "Podolyany", in which took place a number of art exhibitions and presentations.

Building sculptures of Virgin in:
 Borschiv;
 Skala-Podilska;
 Melnitsa-Podilska;
 Veliky Gai;
 Bila, Chortkiv region;
 Lisivci, Zalishchiky region.

Book Publishing
Myroslav Otcovich – thirty years of  Lviv branch of the National research restoration center of Ukraine;
Romanishyn Roman- Terra (Album of works of world famous artist Roman Romanyshyn);

Family 
Wife – Chubak Tatiana L. (1978), sons Chubak Volodymyr (1986), Chubak Nazarii. (2002), Chubak Omelyan. (2005) and daughter Chubak Anhelina  (2008)

Other 
Religion – Greek catholic. However, actively communicates with leaders of religious communities of city and region. Actively charitable support of the church community, regardless of religious affiliation. Actively involved in sports. Favorite sport isfootball (candidate for master of sports). Loves to travel with family and children.

References

Living people
1964 births
Ukrainian businesspeople
People from Ternopil Oblast
Businesspeople in manufacturing
Businesspeople in real estate